RBC Plaza may refer to several current and former office towers of the Royal Bank of Canada:

Current
Royal Bank Plaza, Toronto, Ontario
RBC Plaza (Minneapolis), Minnesota

Former
PNC Plaza (Raleigh), North Carolina